Luis Fernando Suárez Guzmán (born 23 December 1959) is a Colombian football manager and former player who played as a defender. He is the current manager of the Costa Rica national football team.

Suárez has managed in six Latin American countries: Colombia, Ecuador, Peru, Honduras, Mexico and Costa Rica.

Managerial career 

Suárez led the Ecuador national football team to the round of 16 at the 2006 FIFA World Cup and won the 1999 Colombian championship with Atlético Nacional. In 2005, he led Ecuador to their second consecutive World Cup. He has enjoyed hero status in Ecuador and Colombia, leading Ecuador to their best showing in a FIFA World Cup in 2006. Reaching the second round by inflicting defeats on Poland and Costa Rica, they lost to England 1–0 after a David Beckham free kick sailed into the net.

Suárez was offered to keep coaching the Ecuador national team till the next World Cup in 2010. Following a poor 2007 Copa América, many people wanted him out. Suárez stated that he would not resign and would improve his results. Suárez got off to the worst possible start for the 2010 World Cup qualifiers, losing 1–0 at home to Venezuela and receiving a 5–0 hammering by Brazil. After another hammering defeat 5–1 to Paraguay, he resigned irrevocably his position as head coach, immediately after the end of the match. On October 2009 he signed with Juan Aurich, a Peruvian football team.

Honors
As a player
Atlético Nacional
Copa Libertadores: 1989

As a manager
Atlético Nacional
Categoría Primera A: 1999

Managerial statistics

References

External links
Luis Fernando Suárez at Footballdatabase

1959 births
Living people
Footballers from Medellín
Colombian footballers
Association football defenders
Atlético Nacional footballers
Deportivo Pereira footballers
Categoría Primera A players
Colombian football managers
Atlético Nacional managers
Deportivo Cali managers
Deportes Tolima managers
S.D. Aucas managers
Ecuador national football team managers
Juan Aurich managers
Honduras national football team managers
Club Universitario de Deportes managers
Dorados de Sinaloa managers
Atlético Junior managers
Atlético Bucaramanga managers
Costa Rica national football team managers
Peruvian Primera División managers
Liga MX managers
2006 FIFA World Cup managers
2007 Copa América managers
2011 CONCACAF Gold Cup managers
2014 FIFA World Cup managers
2021 CONCACAF Gold Cup managers
Colombian expatriate football managers
Colombian expatriate sportspeople in Ecuador
Colombian expatriate sportspeople in Peru
Colombian expatriate sportspeople in Honduras
Colombian expatriate sportspeople in Mexico
Colombian expatriate sportspeople in Costa Rica
Expatriate football managers in Ecuador
Expatriate football managers in Peru
Expatriate football managers in Honduras
Expatriate football managers in Mexico
Expatriate football managers in Costa Rica
2022 FIFA World Cup managers
La Equidad managers
Deportivo Pereira managers